was Governor of Okinawa Prefecture (1888–1892) and governor of Kōchi Prefecture (1892).

References

Bibliography
安岡, 章太郎 『鏡川』 新潮社、2000年、41頁。
『新潮』2000年3月号に掲載:snippet1 snippet2
上田正昭他『日本人名大辞典』講談社、2001年。
歴代知事編纂会 『日本の歴代知事』3、東京堂出版、1982年、396・525頁。ASIN B000J7L0TO。
『新編日本の歴代知事』、1991年。
太政官「職務進退・元老院　勅奏任官履歴原書　転免病死ノ部 丸岡莞爾」明治3年。国立公文書館 請求番号：本館-2A-031-09・職00148100 件名番号：077

1836 births
1898 deaths
Governors of Okinawa Prefecture
Governors of Kochi Prefecture